The Boxing Federation of India is the Indian national governing body for amateur boxing for Olympic and is the India's member organization of the International Amateur Boxing Association (AIBA). It is headquartered in New Delhi.

History

In 1925, the first governing body for boxing in India, Bombay Presidency Amateur Boxing Federation was formed in Mumbai. Mostly due to the efforts of H.V.Pointon, the President of the Bombay Presidency Amateur Boxing Federation (1944–48), Indian Amateur Boxing Federation was founded on February 25, 1949. Major F.G.Baker became the first secretary at the inaugural meeting at the Governor's Pavilion of the Cricket Club of India in Mumbai. Bombay (Mumbai) became the headquarters of the body. The first National Championships were held at the Brabourne Stadium in Mumbai in March 1950.

Indian Boxing Federation was also known as Indian Amateur Boxing Federation (IABF) and was suspended by the International Amateur Boxing Association in 2014, following which BFI was recognised as the recognised body.

Overview & Championships
The IBF comprises about 6000 registered Indian boxers and it maintains records of their personal and professional details which includes their achievements, medals won and championships participated. Registration to the IBF and possessing an identity card are mandatory for each boxer for participating in any championship organized by it.

The Indian Boxing Federation records are fully digitized. Its website is updated on a daily basis. The facility for online display of the live score of each championship conducted by it is available on its website, which is also availed by all of its affiliated state federations, boards, and units. Its website also provides information about the affiliated state federations, all registered male and female boxers and officials, coaches, and its training centers.

In November 2011 Indian Boxing Federation offered Arash Hashemi of Las Vegas, an Iranian descent and a former member of the 1996 United States of America Boxing Federation to coach the Olympic team, Hashemi rejected the tempting offer saying, "I am an Iranian/American and love my country and people. Hashemi feared they might face an Iranian or an American opponent in major tournaments. Gurbaksh Singh Sandhu, the national coach for about two decades has decided to hang his boots after the London Olympics.

References

External links
 Boxing Federation of India official site

B
Amateur boxing organizations
Boxing in India
1949 establishments in India
Sports organizations established in 1949